The American Society of News Editors (ASNE) was a membership organization for editors, producers or directors in charge of journalistic organizations or departments, deans or faculty at university journalism schools, and leaders and faculty of media-related foundations and training organizations. In 2019, it merged with the Associated Press Media Editors to become the News Leaders Association.

History
The American Society of Newspaper Editors formed after two United States publications took the newspaper industry to task. In January 1922, The Atlantic Monthly featured two articles by Frederick Lewis Allen and Moorfield Storey which were critical of the way in which newspapers were published, and requested change. After reading the articles, Casper Yost — the longtime editor of the St. Louis Globe-Democrat and himself a respected journalist — saw the need for forming an organization of editors willing to combat criticism.

Yost wrote to a few dozen editors soliciting support. The responses were positive and, just a month later, in February 1922, a small meeting was held in Chicago. Attendees included Yost and editors from Cleveland, Detroit, and Chicago. They gathered to discuss action they could take for the advancement of the news and editorial side, to develop a constitution and a code of ethics, and to launch a recruiting campaign for the group. The editors called a meeting in New York that April, when editors would be joining their publishers and congregating for the annual American Newspaper Publishers Association (ANPA) meeting (despite no formal mention of them by ANPA in its bulletins). Their efforts were so successful that by October nearly 100 charter members had signed up.

The organization amended its bylaws and changed its name to the American Society of News Editors in April, 2009. In 2018, a merger with Associated Press Media Editors was announced. From this merger, the News Leaders Association was formed.

Organizational goals
In October 1922, ASNE was launched with directors and officers; they hammered out a code of ethics, named committees and made preparations for the first convention at the New Willard Hotel in Washington the next April. The founders decided that ASNE would be an organization of individual editors of big-city papers — limiting membership to editors of newspapers in cities of 100,000 or more. Since then, rules have been loosened extensively.

Annual meetings

The annual convention was held annually - with the exception of 1945 and 2009 - mostly in Washington.

Over the years, every current U.S. president has spoken at the organization's convention and it was considered a premier venue for politicians to appear. Notable examples are President Coolidge's Press Under a Free Government speech and President Eisenhower's Chance for Peace speech.

Activities
ASNE had several initiatives carried out by its committees. The Diversity Committee was formed to evaluate employee diversity using the Newsroom Employment Census. The census queried every daily newspaper and online news site in the United States to determine the number of news staffers as well as their gender and race as part of the organization's yearly census. The survey continues via News Leaders Association.

Awards

The ASNE Awards were another key initiative of the organization. They included the Batten Medal, the Osborn Award for Editorial Leadership, the Sulzberger Award for Online Storytelling, the Howell Award for Nondeadline Writing, the Royko Award for Commentary/Column Writing, the Distinguished Writing on Diversity Award, the Local Accountability Reporting Award, the Community Service Photojournalism Award and the Breaking News Writing award.

Projects
ASNE also ran several projects, generally carried out by staff with advice from committees. Projects subject areas have included diversity, credibility and readership.

The association started the national Sunshine Week initiative promoting the importance of open government. Sunshine laws were enacted to make sure journalists have access to all government meetings.

Presidents of The ASNE
Source: 

 1922-1926: Casper S. Yost, St. Louis Globe-Democrat
 1926-1928: E. C. Hopwood, Cleveland Plain Dealer
 1928-1930: Walter M. Harrison, The Oklahoman
 1930-1933: Fred Fuller Shedd, Philadelphia Evening Bulletin
 1933-1934: Paul Bellamy, Cleveland Plain Dealer
 1934-1936: Grove Patterson, The Blade (Toledo, Ohio)
 1936-1937: Marvin H. Creager, Milwaukee Journal
 1937-1938: A. H. Kirchhofer, Buffalo Evening News
 1938-1939: William Allen White, Emporia Gazette
 1939-1940: Donald J. Sterling, Oregon Journal
 1940-1941: Tom Wallace, The Louisville Times
 1941-1942: Dwight Marvin, The Record (Troy)
 1942-1943: W. S. Gilmore, Detroit News
 1943-1944: Roy A. Roberts, The Kansas City Star
 1944-1946: John S. Knight, Knight Newspapers
 1946-1947: Wilbur Forrest, New York Herald Tribune
 1947-1948: N. R. Howard, Cleveland News
 1948-1949: Erwin D. Canham, The Christian Science Monitor
 1949-1950: B. M. McKelway, Washington Star
 1950-1951: Dwight Young, Dayton Journal-Herald
 1951-1952: Alexander F. Jones, Syracuse Herald-Journal
 1952-1953: Wright Bryan, Atlanta Journal
 1953-1954: Basil L. Walters, Knight Newspapers
 1954-1955: James S. Pope, Courier-Journal and Louisville Times
 1955-1956: Kenneth MacDonald, Des Moines Register and Tribune
 1956-1957: Jenkin Lloyd Jones Sr., Tulsa Tribune
 1957-1958: Virginius Dabney, Richmond Times-Dispatch
 1958-1959: George W. Healy Jr., New Orleans Times-Picayune
 1959-1960: J. R. Wiggins, Washington Post
 1960-1961: Turner Catledge, New York Times
 1961-1962: Felix R. McKnight, Dallas Times Herald
 1962-1963: Lee Hills, Knight Newspapers
 1963-1964: Herbert Brucker, Hartford Courant
 1964-1965: Miles H. Wolff, Greensboro Daily News
 1965-1966: Vermont Royster, Wall Street Journal
 1966-1967: Robert C. Notson, Portland Oregonian
 1967-1968: Michael J. Ogden, The Providence Journal and Bulletin
 1968-1969: Vincent S. Jones, Gannett Newspapers
 1969-1970: Norman E. Isaacs, Courier-Journal and Louisville Times
 1970-1971: Newbold Noyes, Washington Star
 1971-1972: C. A. McKnight, The Charlotte Observer
 1972-1973: J. Edward Murray, Detroit Free Press
 1973-1974: Arthur C. Deck, Salt Lake Tribune
 1974-1975: Howard H Hays Jr., The Press-Enterprise
 1975-1976: Warren H. Phillips, The Wall Street Journal
 1976-1977: George Chaplin, The Honolulu Advertiser
 1977-1978: Eugene C. Patterson, St. Petersburg Times
 1978-1979: John Hughes, The Christian Science Monitor
 1979-1980: William H. Hornby, The Denver Post
 1980-1981: Thomas Winship, The Boston Globe
 1981-1982: Michael J. O’Neill, New York Daily News
 1982-1983: John C. Quinn, Gannett Newspapers
 1983-1984: Creed C. Black, Lexington Herald-Leader
 1984-1985: Richard D. Smyser, The Oak Ridger
 1985-1986: Robert P. Clark, Harte-Hanks Newspapers
 1986-1987: Michael G. Gartner, The Courier-Journal
 1987-1988: Katherine W. Fanning, The Christian Science Monitor
 1988-1988: Edward R. Cony, The Wall Street Journal
 1988-1989: John Seigenthaler, USA Today and The Tennessean
 1989-1990: Loren Ghiglione, The News
 1990-1991: Burl Osborne, The Dallas Morning News
 1991-1992: David Lawrence Jr., The Miami Herald
 1992-1993: Seymour Topping, The New York Times
 1993-1994: William A. Hilliard, The Oregonian
 1994-1995: Gregory Favre, The Sacramento Bee
 1995-1996: William B. Ketter, The Patriot Ledger
 1996-1997: Robert H. Giles, The Detroit News
 1997-1998: Sandra Mims Rowe, The Oregonian
 1998-1999: Edward L. Seaton, The Manhattan Mercury
 1999-2000: N. Christian Anderson, The Orange County Register
 2000-2001: Richard A. Oppel, Austin American-Statesman
 2001-2002: Tim J. McGuire, Star Tribune
 2002-2003: Diane H. McFarlin, Sarasota Herald Tribune
 2003-2004: Peter K. Bhatia, The Oregonian
 2004-2005: Karla Garrett Harshaw, Springfield News-Sun
 2005-2006: Rick Rodriguez, The Sacramento Bee
 2006-2007: David A. Zeeck, The News Tribune
 2007-2008: Gilbert Bailon, Al Día, and St. Louis Post-Dispatch
 2008-2009: Charlotte H. Hall, Orlando Sentinel
 2009-2010: Martin Kaiser, Milwaukee Journal Sentinel
 2010-2011: Milton Coleman, The Washington Post
 2011-2012: Ken Paulson, First Amendment Center
 2012-2013: Susan Goldberg, Bloomberg
 2013-2014: David Boardman, Temple University
 2014-2015: Chris Peck, The Riverton Ranger (Riverton, Wyoming)
 2015-2016: Pam Fine, The University of Kansas
 2016-2017: Mizell Stewart III, Gannett and USA TODAY Network
 2017-2018: Alfredo Carabajal, Al Día at The Dallas Morning News

References

External links

 of the Sunshine Week

American journalism organizations
Editor organizations
Newspaper
Journalism-related professional associations
Organizations established in 1922
1922 establishments in Illinois